Dysoptus fasciatus is a species of moth in the family Arrhenophanidae. It probably has a wide distribution in the lowland Amazon rainforest. Currently it has been collected only at the type locality in southern Venezuela and possibly in Peru.

The length of the forewings is about 4.1 mm for males and about 9.1 for females. Adults are on wing in early February.

Etymology
The specific name is derived from the Latin fasciatus (banded), in reference to the distinctive banding present on the forewing and hindwing.

External links
Family Arrhenophanidae

Dysoptus
Taxa named by Donald R. Davis (entomologist)
Moths described in 2003